Tim Roth (born August 14, 1948) is a Canadian football player who played professionally for the Saskatchewan Roughriders.

References

1948 births
Living people
Saskatchewan Roughriders players
Sportspeople from Madison, Wisconsin
American players of Canadian football
South Dakota State Jackrabbits football players